Final Appointment is a 1954 British comedy thriller film directed by Terence Fisher, and starring John Bentley, Eleanor Summerfield and Hubert Gregg. It also featured Arthur Lowe, later to become famous for his portrayal of Captain Mainwaring in Dad's Army, in an early role. It was shot at Walton Studios outside London. The film was produced by Francis Searle for ACTFilms, and was released in the U.S. as The Last Appointment. A sequel, Stolen Assignment, also featuring sleuthing journalists Mike Billings and Jenny Drew, appeared the following year.

Synopsis
A former soldier who was court-martialled during the Second World War sets out to murder the officers who passed sentence on him. After the lawyer who acted for the prosecution at the court martial receives threatening letters a newspaper reporter and his wisecracking girlfriend try to track down the killer.

Cast

 John Bentley as Mike Billings
 Eleanor Summerfield as Jenny Drew
 Hubert Gregg as Hartnell
 Liam Redmond as Inspector Corcoran
 Meredith Edwards as Tom Martin
 Jean Lodge as Laura Robens
 Sam Kydd as Vickery
 Charles Farrell as Percy
 Peter Bathurst as Harold Williams
 Arthur Lowe as Barratt
 Gerald Case as Australian Official
 Jessica Cairns as War Office Typist
 Tony Hilton as Jimmy	
 Henry de Bray as Restaurant Manager	
 John Watson as Police Sergeant

Recent assessment of the film
The Radio Times gave the film two out of five stars, calling it a "Capable thriller."

References

External links
 

1954 films
Films directed by Terence Fisher
British comedy thriller films
Films shot at Nettlefold Studios
1950s English-language films
1950s comedy thriller films
British black-and-white films
1950s British films